Ton Thie (28 October 1944 – 25 February 2021) was a Dutch professional footballer who played as a goalkeeper for GC & FC Olympia, Excelsior, Hermes DVS, ADO Den Haag, and the San Francisco Golden Gate Gales.

Club career
Thie started at his hometown club GC & FC Olympia and was discovered by Excelsior coach Bob Janse. He played for Hermes DVS in the professional Tweede Divisie from 1962 until 1964. Tall and agile, he was signed by ADO Den Haag. He made 380 appearances for ADO Den Haag and won the KNVB Cup twice. His final game for them came in December 1976 against AZ'67. He was voted Den Haag's best goalkeeper of all time at the club's 100 year anniversary.

International career
Thie was also selected on one occasion to the Dutch national squad, but did not make an appearance.

Personal life
In 1996 he retired to The Gambia following a holiday. He died on 25 February 2021, aged 76.

References

1944 births
2021 deaths
Footballers from Gouda, South Holland
Association football goalkeepers
Dutch footballers
Excelsior Rotterdam players
Hermes DVS players
ADO Den Haag players
San Francisco Golden Gate Gales players
Tweede Divisie players
Eredivisie players
United Soccer Association players
Dutch expatriate footballers
Dutch expatriate sportspeople in the United States
Expatriate soccer players in the United States